Pirhuaylla is a  mountain in the Andes of Peru. It is situated in the Ayacucho Region, Cangallo Province, Paras District, southeast of Paras. The Pampas River flows along its southern slopes. It harbors an archaeological site.

References

Mountains of Peru
Mountains of Ayacucho Region
Archaeological sites in Peru